Ranger Peak is in the northern Teton Range, Grand Teton National Park, Wyoming. The peak is located slightly northwest of and across Jackson Lake from Colter Bay Village. Colter Canyon is to the north while Waterfalls Canyon is immediately southeast of the peak, but there are no maintained trails in the area. Access to the summit involves off trail hiking and scrambling.

On March 7, 2012, Chris Onufer and Steve Romeo, both local residents and considered expert skiers, were killed by an avalanche on Ranger Peak. The avalanche originated in a couloir on the north side of Waterfalls Canyon at the  level and traveled more than  down the mountain slope into the canyon.

References

Mountains of Grand Teton National Park
Mountains of Wyoming
Mountains of Teton County, Wyoming